The UCI Road World Championships – Men's team time trial was a world championship for road bicycle racing in the discipline of team time trial (TTT). It is organized by the world governing body, the Union Cycliste Internationale (UCI).

National teams (1962–1994)
A championship for national teams was introduced in 1962 and held until 1994. It was held annually, except that from 1972 onward, the TTT was not held in Olympic years. There were 4 riders per team on a route around 100 kilometres long. Italy is the most successful nation with seven victories.

Medal winners

Medals by nation

Most successful riders

UCI teams (2012–2018)
There was a long break until a championship for trade teams was introduced in 2012. There were 6 riders per team. The championship was held up to 2018.

Medal winners

Most successful teams

Most successful riders

References 
 
 

 
Men's Team Time Trial
Recurring sporting events established in 1962
UCI World Tour races
Men's road bicycle races
Lists of UCI Road World Championships medalists
Recurring sporting events disestablished in 2018